Veedu is a 1988 Indian Tamil-language film directed by Balu Mahendra. Starring Archana as the central character, it depicts the difficulties faced by a middle-class family in building a house. Apart from directing, Balu Mahendra wrote the script, photographed and did the editing as well. The film score by Ilaiyaraaja earned critical acclaim. At the 35th National Film Awards, the film received two awards including one for the Best Tamil Film. Archana won the National Film Award for Best Actress in 1987 for her role in this film. The film was also screened at the "Indian Panorama" of the International Film Festival of India in 1988. Apart from winning critical acclaim, the film was made on a budget of 12 lakhs and collected 72 lakhs at the box office.

Plot 
Sudha, a 22-year-old unmarried woman, lives in an apartment in Madras with her younger sister (Indhu) and grandfather (Murugesan). She is engaged to her colleague Gopi. The owner of the tenement wants all the families to vacate the place as he intends to construct another building on the same site. Sudha's attempts for searching an alternative house turn out to be unsuccessful as her family could not afford the rents fixed by them. At this juncture, she is advised by Iyengar, one of her colleagues, to start constructing a new house. Though initially hesitant, she decides to build a house after Iyengar motivates her. Sudha's grandfather already owns two construction sites in the outskirts of the city. They decide to construct the house on one of them and sell the other one to raise money. In addition, she also seeks a housing loan and pledges her jewels for money. During this time, Sudha gets introduced to a building contractor who drafts a plan for the house. To get the plan approved they had to bribe a government official. By this time, unexpected rains halt the construction thereby inflating the cost. Though Gopi comes forward to provide financial assistance, Sudha declines it stating that his sister's marriage would get affected if he provided money.

A kind-hearted Mangamma, a construction worker, helps Sudha in the construction. When she finds that the contractor steals materials from the site, she informs Sudha which in turn leads to the contractor quitting. Mangamma along with her supervisor, and Iyengar help Sudha during this time as the construction work resumes. Meanwhile, as the sanctioning of loan gets delayed, Sudha seeks monetary help from her  superior. She becomes even more dejected only to know that he is a womanizer. With all her funds exhausted, she decides to halt the construction. But Gopi offers some assistance and the work continues to progress further. An excited Murugesan visits the site alone on a Sunday and passes away while returning home. Sudha becomes depressed over the situation. When the house is nearing completion, and when Sudha and Gopi appraise each other, an official from the Metropolitan Water Authority lands at the site and asks them how can they construct a house in a land which was already acquired by the authority. In the end, Sudha is shown sitting in the panchayat office and voice over states that she is seeking justice in the court.

Cast 
 Archana as Sudha
 Bhanu Chander as Gopi
 Chokkalinga Bhagavathar as Murugesan
Pasi Sathya as Mangamma
 Indhu as Indhu
Senthamarai
 Veera Raghavan
 Oru Viral Krishna Rao
 Rallapalli as  Manager 
 Nair Raman
 Director Bala as postman

Production 
According to Balu Mahendra, Veedu was inspired from his mother. He recalled in an interview that his mother started building a house when he was eight years old, which affected her psychologically. He cites, "She was not the same after that. She became temperamental. She forgot to laugh. She had no time to teach us or play with us. The changes confused me. Years later, Veedu brought this transformation to life." The childhood event affected Balu Mahendra, and he developed the script based on it. He opted to make the film in Tamil as he felt not many good films were made in Tamil cinema then. The filming began in 1987, coinciding with the International Year of Shelter.

Made on a shoestring budget of ₹12 lakh (worth ₹4 crore in 2021 prices), the film's central theme revolved around the struggle of a middle-class family to build a house. It also marginally focussed on the change in human behaviour and corruption. The story was credited to Balu Mahendra's wife Akhila Mahendra, while he wrote the screenplay, filmed and edited apart from directing the film. The film does not feature any soundtrack. Ilaiyaraaja, a Balu Mahendra regular, was signed as the composer. On the latter's request, he used portions of his composition from the album How to Name It? for the film score. Most of the sequences were narrated through jump cuts and montages, shot mostly using a hand-held camera.

Reception 
Although filming began in 1987, the film was released only a year after. It turned out to be a box-office failure but won critical acclaim. N. Krishnaswamy of The Indian Express wrote, "With Veedu, Balu Mahenddra becomes the first auteur (author) in Tamil cinema [...] Balu Mahendra, always among the frontline directors in the South, has with Veedu set himself quite apart making it a tall order for others to bridge the gap". Balu Mahendra admitted that he did not expect the film to be a box-office success or a failure, but would have the satisfaction of having made a good film. Archana's portrayal as a middle-class woman fetched her a lot of accolades from the critics. Chokkalinga Bhagavathar, who played her grandfather, received equal praise. He was a strong contender for that year's National Film Award for Best Actor, but eventually lost to Kamal Haasan. At the 35th National Film Awards, the film won in two categories – Best Feature Film in Tamil, and Best Actress for Archana. The film was among the 16 films to be screened at the Indian Panorama section of the International Film Festival of India in 1988. Balu Mahendra won the Cinema Express Award for Best Director – Tamil. In 2002, the film was screened at the "Indian Summer" section of the Locarno International Film Festival.

Legacy 
In a 2013 review, Ananda Vikatan called Veedu to be among the two films that took Tamil cinema to world cinema level. Further, it praised the film for highlighting the plight of Indian middle-class families and the political set up of the nation. It stated Veedu was one of the few Tamil films that scores good on both content and narration, and also appreciated Balu Mahendra's directorial skills. Critics praised the film for being more visual and Balu Mahendra's understanding of cinema as a visual medium. However, the magazine criticised the usage of background score in the film as it felt it lessened the impact of an otherwise good film. S. Theodore Baskaran in his The Eye of The Serpent: An Introduction To Tamil Cinema states that Veedu was a "striking departure" from the previous films of Balu Mahendra, as it was devoid of commercial elements like dance, songs, fight and comedy sequences. While analysing Archana's characterisation, Baskaran noted Balu Mahendra's penchant for strong characterisation of his female leads. Balu Mahendra had to construct a house which was mean to be a set for the house which was shown in the film. The building which was later fully constructed, now houses the film school started by Balu Mahendra in 2007. In many interviews, Balu Mahendra had claimed that Veedu and Sandhya Raagam were the only films that satisfied him the most as he made in these two the fewest mistakes and compromises. The negative of the film is lost.

References

Bibliography

External links 
 

1980s Tamil-language films
1988 films
Best Tamil Feature Film National Film Award winners
Films directed by Balu Mahendra
Films featuring a Best Actress National Award-winning performance
Films scored by Ilaiyaraaja